The Rite of Strict Observance was a Rite of Freemasonry, a series of progressive degrees that were conferred by the Order of Strict Observance, a Masonic body of the 18th century.

History
Baron Karl Gotthelf von Hund (1722–1776) introduced a new "Scottish" Rite to Germany, which he renamed "Rectified Masonry" and, after 1764, the "Strict Observance", while referring to the English system of Freemasonry as the "Late Observance."

The Rite appealed to German national pride, attracted the non-nobility, and was allegedly directed by "Unknown Superiors". The Strict Observance was particularly devoted to the reform of Masonry, with special reference to the elimination of the occult sciences which at the time were widely practiced in many lodges, and the establishment of cohesion and homogeneity in Masonry through the enforcement of strict discipline, the regulation of functions, etc.

By 1768 the Rite of Strict Observance counted some forty lodges.

Despite its initial popularity, growing dissatisfaction among members over the failure to being initiated into the mysteries of the Unknown Superiors led to the Convent of Wilhelmsbad in 1782. The delegates there renounced their Templar origins (not unanimously) and gave greater self-governance to the lodges, resulting in the order fragmenting and the lodges adopting other rites over the next few years.

Degree structure
The degrees of the Rite of Strict Observance were 
 1° Apprentice
 2° Fellow
 3° Master
 4° Scots Master
 5° Secular Novice
 6° Knight
 7° Lay Brother

An English translation of these rituals was made by Masonic scholars Arturo de Hoyos and Alain Bernheim, and were printed in Collectanea (Grand College of Rites, 2010), Vol 21, Pt 1.

References

See also
 Rectified Scottish Rite
 Swedish Rite
 List of Masonic Rites

Masonic rites